Mary Ann McCall (May 4, 1919 in Philadelphia, Pennsylvania, United States – December 14, 1994 in Los Angeles, California) was an American pop and jazz singer. Aside from solo work, she sang for Charlie Barnet, Tommy Dorsey, Artie Shaw and Woody Herman. She was briefly married to Al Cohn. In 1949, she won the Down Beat Readers' Poll for "Girl Singer (With Band)".

Discography
 Mary McCall Sings (Discovery, 1950)
 An Evening with Charlie Ventura and Mary Ann McCall (Norgran, 1954)
 Easy Living (Regent, 1957)
 Detour to the Moon (Jubilee, 1958)
 Melancholy Baby (Coral, 1959)

As guest
 Nat Pierce, 5400 North (Hep, 1979)

References

1919 births
1994 deaths
American women jazz singers
American jazz singers
Traditional pop music singers
Musicians from Philadelphia
20th-century American singers
20th-century American women singers
Jazz musicians from Pennsylvania
Discovery Records artists